Martin Otáhal (born 28 March 1971) is a Czech sprint canoer who competed in the mid-1990s. He was eliminated in the semifinals of the K-4 1000 m event at the 1996 Summer Olympics in Atlanta.

References
Sports-Reference.com profile

1971 births
Canoeists at the 1996 Summer Olympics
Czech male canoeists
Living people
Olympic canoeists of the Czech Republic
Place of birth missing (living people)